The Rolls-Royce RB.50 Trent was the first Rolls-Royce turboprop engine.

Design and development
The Trent was based on a concept by Sir Frank Whittle. It was a Derwent Mark II turbojet engine with a cropped impeller (turbine unchanged) and a reduction gearbox (designed by A A Rubbra) connected to a five-bladed Rotol propeller. The Trent ran for 633 hours on test before being installed in a Gloster Meteor jet fighter which flew for the first time on 20 September 1945 at the start of a  298-hour flight test programme.

Applications
Gloster Meteor

Engines on display
A preserved Rolls-Royce Trent turboprop engine is on display at the London Science Museum.

A preserved RB50 Trent is displayed at the Rolls-Royce Heritage Trust in Derby.

Specifications

See also

References

Notes

Bibliography

 Gunston, Bill. World Encyclopedia of Aero Engines. Cambridge, England. Patrick Stephens Limited, 1989.

External links

 "The First Propeller Turbine Engine to Fly" a 1946 Rolls-Royce advertisement in Flight
 "Know-How From the Trent" a 1947 Flight article
 Trent Meteor "In the Air" - a 1948 Flight article on flying the Trent Meteor

1940s turboprop engines
Trent
Centrifugal-flow gas turbine engines